Gordon D Love is an optics researcher and Professor of Physics at  Durham University. He is noted for work in Adaptive Optics.

He is a Council Member of the Institute of Physics and past board member of the European Optical Society.

Education
Love earned both his Bachelor of Science and doctorate from Durham University. He was an undergraduate at Van Mildert College.

References

External links 

 Home page at Durham
 Publications from Google Scholar

Fellows of the Institute of Physics
Academics of Durham University
Optical physicists
1967 births
Living people
Alumni of Van Mildert College, Durham